"Gagap" (translation: Stutter) is a song written and produced by Kieran Kuek with lyrics by Mode for Stacy's debut album, Aku Stacy (2009). It was released on 27 December 2008 as the second single from the album.

Single release 
Despite her busy schedules to be fully prepared for the Anugerah Juara Lagu, Stacy performed "Gagap" in the season finale of Sehati Berdansa. She also performed the song in her shows throughout Malaysia in order to promote the song. The song deals with the issue of unfaithfulness. Its lyrics talks about a relationship turns sour in which the persona is questioning the cause behind her lover's sudden of change. When all is said and done, she finally finds out that her lover is cheating on her behind her back.

Track listing 
 "Gagap [Studio Version]" – 3:49
Composed : Kieran Kuek
 Lyric : Mode

Chart performance 
The song debuted on Carta Era at #11, peaking at #2 as it was being held back by Alyah's "Tak Mungkin Kerna Sayang". To date, the song has spent more than 25 weeks in the chart, making it one of the songs that stays in the chart for a long period of time. In Hot FM 30, the song debuted at #17 and is steadily climbing the chart. It managed to peak at #5 before finally exiting of chart. The song also entered Muzik FM at #10 and managed to peak at #4. In Carta Muzik Muzik, the single managed to peak at #2 and being held off by Adam's "Benar-Benar". However, the song exited the chart for being disqualified for unknown reason.

References 

2008 singles
Stacy (singer) songs
2008 songs